Sidoktaya Township  is a township of Minbu District in the Magway Region of Myanmar.  The principal town is Sidoktaya.

References 

Townships of Magway Region